Nabin Jatra was a Bengali drama film directed by Subodh Mitra. This film was released on 11 September 1953 under the banner of New Theatres. Pankaj Mullick was the music director of the movie.

Plot

Cast
 Uttam Kumar
 Maya Mukherjee
 Tulsi Chakraborty
 Basanta Choudhury
 Kali Banerjee
 Molina Devi
 Harimohan Bose
 Debabala
 Samar Kumar
 Parijat Bose
 Naresh Bose
 Rekha Chattopadhyay

References

External links
 

1953 films
Bengali-language Indian films
Indian drama films
1950s Bengali-language films
1953 drama films